(Main list of acronyms)


 n – (s) Nano
 N – (s) Newton – Nitrogen – North

N0–9
 N3F – (i) National Fantasy Fan Federation

NA
 na – (s) Nauruan language (ISO 639-1 code)
 nA – (s) Nanoampere
 Na – (s) Sodium (Latin Natrium)
 NA
 (s) Namibia (ISO 3166 digram)
 (i) Narcotics Anonymous
 National Archives
 Negative Acknowledge
 N/A
 (i) Neurotics Anonymous
 not available/applicable
 NAA – (p) N-Acetylaspartate
 NAAD – (i) North American Air Defense
 NAAFI
 (a) Navy, Army and Air Force Institute (UK)
 (a) No Ambition And Fuckall Interest (RSA army slang)
 NAAK – (a) Mark I NAAK, Nerve Agent Antidote Kit
 NAACP – (i) National Association for the Advancement of Colored People ("N double-A CP")
 NAAQS – (a) National Ambient Air Quality Standards
 NAAWS – (i) NATO Anti-Air Warfare System
 NABCI – (a) North American Bird Conservation Initiative ("nab-see")
 NAC
 (i/a) National Agency Check
 U.S. Naval Avionics Center
 U.S. Navy Advanced Concepts
 NOAD ADVENDO Combinatie, the full name of the Dutch football club NAC Breda
 North Atlantic Council
 Northern Area Command
 NACA – (i) (U.S.) National Advisory Committee for Aeronautics (1915–1958, became NASA)
 NACC – (i) North Atlantic Cooperation Council
 NACISA – (a) NATO Communications and Information Systems Agency
 NACMA – (p) NATO Air Command and Control System Management Agency
 NACRA – (a) North America Caribbean Rugby Association (more specifically rugby union), a former name of Rugby Americas North
 NAD – (s) Namibian dollar (ISO 4217 currency code)
 NAEC – (i) U.S. Naval Air Engineering Center
 NAF
 (a) NATO Architecture Framework
 (i) Naval Air Facility
 NAFLD – (i) NonAlcoholic Fatty Liver Disease
 NAFO – (a) Northwest Atlantic Fisheries Organization
 NAFERA – (a) Native American Free Exercise of Religion Act
 NAFTA – (a) North American Free Trade Agreement
 NAGPRA – (a) Native American Graves Protection and Repatriation Act
 NAI
 (i) Named Area of Interest
 Network Access Identifier
 NAICS – (a) North American Industry Classification System
 NAIL – (i) Neurotics Anonymous
 NAILS – (a) National Airspace Integrated Logistics System
 NAIRU – (a) Non Accelerating Inflation Rate of Unemployment
 NAK – (p) Negative Acknowledge
 NAM – (s) Namibia (ISO 3166 trigram)
 NAMBLA – (a) North American Man-Boy Love Association
 NAMRL – (i) Naval Aerospace Medical Research Laboratory
 NaN – (i) Not A Number (computing)
 NANP – (i) North American Numbering Plan (telephone)
 NAO – (i) UK National Audit Office
 NAPDD – (i) Non-Acquisition Program Definition Document ("nap-dee-dee")
 NAPS – (a) Navy Acquisition Procedures Supplement
 NARA – (i) (U.S.) National Archives and Records Administration
 NARAL – (a) National Abortion Rights Action League
 NARDAC – (a) Naval Regional Data Automation Center
 NARDIC – (a) U.S. Navy Acquisition Research and Development Information Center
 NARP – (a) Non-Athletic Regular Person
 NARPV – (i) National Association for Remotely Piloted Vehicles
 NAS
 (i) National Academy of Sciences
 National Air Space
 National Audubon Society
 Naval Air Station
 New Attack Submarine
 NASA 
 (a) National Aeronautics and Space Administration
 North American Saxophone Alliance
 NASB – (i) New American Standard Bible
 NASCAR – (a) National Association for Stock Car Auto Racing
 NASDAQ – (a) National Association of Securities Dealers Automated Quotations
 NASED – (a) National Association of State Election Directors 
 NASH – (a) Non-Alcoholic Steatohepatitis
 NASP – (p) National Aerospace Plane
 NASS – (a) National Association of Secretaries of State 
 NatGeo - (a) National Geographic
 NATO
 (a) National Association of Theatre Owners
 North Atlantic Treaty Organization
 nau – (s) Nauruan language (ISO 639-2 code)
 NaUKMA – (p) National University of Kyiv-Mohyla Academy
 nav – (s) Navajo language (ISO 639-2 code)
 NAV – (p) Navigation[al]
 NAVCAMS – (p) Naval Communications Area Master Station
 NAVCC – (p) National Audio-Visual Conservation Center
 NAVCC (Navy) – (p) Navy Component Commander
 NAVCENT – (p) Naval Forces U.S. Central Command
 NAVDAC – (p) Naval Data Automation Command
 NAVEUR – (p) Naval Forces U.S. European Command
 NAVFE – (p) U.S. Naval Forces, Far East
 NAVFOR – (p) Naval Force
 NAVMACS – (p) Naval Modular Automatic Communication Subsystem
 NAVNET – (p) Navy Network
 NAVS – (a) Non-Cooperative Airborne Vector Scoring
 NAVSAT – (p) Navigation Satellite
 NAVSPACECOM – (p) U.S. Navy Space Command
 NAVSPASUR – (p) U.S. Naval Space Surveillance System
 NAVSTAR – (p) Navigation Satellite Timing And Ranging
 NAVTACNET – (p) Navy Tactical Network
 NAWC – (i) U.S. Naval Air Warfare Center
 NAWIRA – (a) North America and West Indies Rugby Association, the original name of the organization now known as Rugby Americas North
 NAWMP – (a) North American Waterfowl Management Plan ("gnaw-wump")

NB
 nb – (s) Norwegian Bokmål language (ISO 639-1 code)
 Nb – (s) Niobium
 NB – (s) New Brunswick (postal symbol) – (i) nota bene (Latin, "mark well")
 NBA – (i) National Basketball Association
 NBACC – (i) U.S. National Biodefense Analysis and Countermeasures Center ("enn-back")
 NBC – (i) National Broadcasting Corporation – Nuclear, Biological, and Chemical
 NBCRS – (i) NBC (Nuclear, Biological, and Chemical) Reconnaissance System
 NBIC – (i) Nanotechnology, Biotechnology, Information Technology, Cognitive Science
 nbl – (s) Southern Ndebele language (ISO 639-2 code)
 NBL – (a) National Basketball League (Australia)
 NBT – (p) Nitroblue tetrazolium (assay)

NC
 nC – (s) Nanocoulomb
 NC
 (i) Network Computer
 (s) New Caledonia (ISO 3166 digram)
 (i) Node Center
 Nonconsensual
 Normally Closed
 (s) North Carolina (postal symbol)
 NCA – (i) National Command Authority
 NC3A or NC3A – (i) NATO Consultation, Command and Control Agency
 NCAA – (i) National Collegiate Athletic Association ("NC double A")
 NCAR – (i) U.S. National Center for Atmospheric Research
 NCB – (i) National Codification Bureau
 NCCAM – (i) U.S. National Center for Complementary and Alternative Medicine
 NCCUSL – (i) National Conference of Commissioners on Uniform State Laws (U.S.)
 NCDDR – (i) U.S. National Center for the Dissemination of Disability Research
 NCES
 (i) U.S. National Center for Education Statistics
 Net-Centric Enterprise Services
 NCI – (i) U.S. National Cancer Institute
 NCIS
 (i) National Criminal Intelligence Service (British)
 Naval Criminal Investigative Service (U.S. Navy; see also NCIS, a U.S. TV series based on this unit)
 NCL – (s) New Caledonia (ISO 3166 trigram)
 NCLR – (i) National Council of La Raza
 NCMO – (i) No Commitment Make Out
 NCND
 (i) Noncircumvention and Nondisclosure
 (i) Neither Confirm Nor Deny
 NCO – (i) Noncommissioned Officer
 NCP – (i) Net Contracted Purchases
 NCR – (i) National Cash Register Co.
 NCTR – (i) Noncooperative Target Recognition
 NCW – (i) Network Centric Warfare

ND
 nd – (s) Northern Ndebele language (ISO 639-1 code)
 Nd – (s) Neodymium
N.D. – (i) Nobilis Domina (noble woman) 
 ND
 (i) Nondisclosure
 (s) North Dakota (postal symbol)

 NDA - (i) Non-Disclosure Agreement
 NDAA – (i) U.S. National Defense Authorization Act
 NDBP – (i) Non-Departmental Public Body (Scotland)
 NDC - (i) National Drug Code
 NDCC – (i) New Directions Counseling Center (Concord, California)
 nde – (s) Northern Ndebele language (ISO 639-2 code)
 NDH
 (i) Neue Deutsche Härte (German, "new German hardness"—heavy metal genre)
 Nezavisna Država Hrvatska (Croatian, "Independent State of Croatia"—Nazi puppet state)
 ndo – (s) Ndonga language (ISO 639-2 code)
 N-dof or NDOF – (i) Number of Degrees of Freedom
 NDP – (i) New Democratic Party (Canada)
 NDS – Nintendo DS
 NDU – (i) National Defense University (Washington, DC)

NE
 ne – (s) Nepali language (ISO 639-1 code)
 Ne – (s) Neon
 NE
 (s) Nebraska (postal symbol)
 Niger (ISO 3166 digram)
 (i) North-East
 NEA
 (i) National Education Association (U.S. labor union)
 Near-Earth Asteroid
 Nuclear Energy Agency (OECD)
 NEAT
 Near-Earth Asteroid Tracking - (a) 
 National Emergency Access Target (a) (Au Health)
 NEC
 (i) Network-enabled capability
 Nijmegen Eendracht Combinatie (Dutch, "Nijmegen Unity Combination"; football club formed by the 1910 merger of the Nijmegen and Eendracht clubs)
 Nippon Electric Company, the original English-language name of the company now known as NEC
 (p) Northeast Conference (U.S. college sports)
 NED – (s) Netherlands (IOC and FIFA trigram, but not ISO 3166)
 NECTEC – (a) National Electronics and Computer Technology Center (Thailand)
 NEI
 (i) National Eye Institute
  Not Enough Information
 Nuclear Energy Institute
 NEIC (i)
 U.S. National Earthquake Information Center
 National Economic Intelligence Committee (Nigeria)
 National Energy Information Center (U.S. DOE)
 National Enforcement Investigations Center (U.S. EPA)
 nem con – (p) nemine contradicente (Latin, "no one contradicting")
 nem diss – (p) nemine dissentiente (Latin, "no one dissenting")
 NEMS – (i) National Energy Modeling System (USDOE-EIA)
 NEO
 (i) Near-Earth Object
 Non-combatant Evacuation Operations
 nep – (s) Nepali language (ISO 639-2 code)
 NEPA – (a) National Environmental Policy Act
 NER – (s) Niger (ISO 3166 trigram)
 NERF - (a) Non-Expanding Recreational Foam
 NERICA – (p) New Rice for Africa
 NESDIS – (a) National Environmental Satellite, Data and Information Service
 NESP – (i) NSA/CSS Enterprise Standards Program
 NESS-T – (p) Near-Earth Space Surveillance – Terrestrial project
 NET
 (i) National Educational Television
 (i/a) NCAA Evaluation Tool, a metric used in the NCAA Division I men's and women's basketball tournament selection process
 NETCU – (i) (UK) National Extremism Tactical Co-ordination Unit
 NETL – (a) (US) National Energy Technology Laboratory
 NETWARS – (p) Network Warfare Simulation
 NEWHA – (i) New England Women's Hockey Alliance
 NEWS
 (a) Navy Electronic Warfare Simulator
 North, East, West, South
 NEX – (p) Navy EXchange

NF
 nF – (s) Nanofarad
 NF
 (s) Newfoundland (and Labrador) (obsolete postal code, replaced by NL)
 Norfolk Island (ISO 3166 digram)
 NFA
 (i) (U.S.) National Firearms Act (often used to refer to the guns and accessories regulated under this law)
 No-Fire Area
 NFC
 (i) National Football Conference
 Near field communication
 NFER – (i) National Foundation for Educational Research
 NFG – (i) No F**king Good
 NFHS – (i) National Federation of State High School Associations
 NFI – (i) Not F****** Interested
 NFK – (s) Norfolk Island (ISO 3166 trigram)
 NFL
 (i) National Football League
 National Forensic League, original name of the National Speech and Debate Association
 No-Fire Line
 Nfld – (p) Newfoundland
 NFPA – (a) National Fluid Power Association (United States)
 NFT
 (p) Neurofibrillary tangle
 (i) No Further Text
 Non-fungible token
NFS
 (i) Network File System

NG
 ng – (s) Nanogram – Ndonga language (ISO 639-1 code)
 NG
 (i) Natural Gas
 Next Generation
 (s) Niger (FIPS 10-4 country code)
 Nigeria (ISO 3166 digram)
 NGA
 (i) National Geospatial-Intelligence Agency
 (s) Nigeria (ISO 3166 trigram)
 NGH – Northern General Hospital
 ngl – (i) Not gonna lie
 NGATS – (i) New Generation Army Targetry System
 NGIC – (a) National Ground Intelligence Center ("Injick")
 NGN – (s) Nigerian naira (ISO 4217 currency code)
 NGO – (i) non-governmental organization
 NGR – (s) Nigeria (IOC trigram, but not ISO 3166 or FIFA)
 NGS – (i) Naval Gunfire Support

NH
nH – (s) Nanohenry
 NH – (s) New Hampshire (postal symbol) – New Hebrides (ISO 3166 digram; obsolete 1980) – Vanuatu (FIPS 10-4 country code; from New Hebrides)
N.H. – (i) Nobilis Homo (noble man)
 NHANES – (i) National Health and Nutrition Examination Survey
 NHB – (s) New Hebrides (ISO 3166 trigram; obsolete 1980)
 NHB – (i) No holds barred
 NHL – (i) National Hockey League
 NHO – (i) Næringslivets Hovedorganisasjon (Confederation of Norwegian Enterprises, a Norwegian employers' organisation)
 NHRA – (i) National Hot Rod Association
 NHS – (i) National Health Service (UK)

NI
 Ni – (s) Nickel
 NI
 (s) Nicaragua (ISO 3166 digram)
 Nigeria (FIPS 10-4 country code)
 NIAAA – (i) U.S. National Institute on Alcohol Abuse and Alcoholism
 NIAID – (a) National Institute of Allergies and Infectious Disease
 NIAG – (a) NATO Industrial Advisory Group
 NIAMD – (i) National Institute of Arthritis and Musculoskeletal Diseases
 NIB – (i) New In Box (Internet auction/trading listings)
 NIBP – (i) Non-invasive blood pressure monitor
 NIC
 (a) Network Interface Card
 (s) Nicaragua (ISO 3166 trigram)
 NicA – (i) Nicotine Anonymous
 NICAP – (a) National Investigations Committee on Aerial Phenomena
 NICE – (p) UK. National Institute for Health and Clinical Excellence
 NICHD – National Institute of Child Health and Human Development 
 NICP – (i) National Inventory Control Point
 NIDDK – (i) National Institute of Diabetes and Digestive and Kidney Diseases
 NIDRR – (i) National Institute on Disability Research and Rehabilitation
 NIEHS – (i) National Institute of Environmental Health Sciences
 NIG – (s) Niger (IOC and FIFA trigram, but not ISO 3166)
 NIH
 (i) National Institutes of Health
 Not Invented Here
 NIIN – (i) National Item Identification Number
 NIL
 (i) Name, image, and likeness (referring to U.S. student athlete compensation)
 (p) Nanoimprint lithography
 (i) Nomina im Indogermanischen Lexikon (German, "Nominals in the Indo-European Lexicon") – etymological dictionary of Proto-Indo-European nominals
 NIMA – (a) National Imagery and Mapping Agency (became NGA)
 NIMBY – (a) Not In My Back Yard (See NOME)
 NIMG – (i) Not In My Generation
 NiMH – (p) nickel metal hydride ("Ni" is the chemical symbol for nickel)
 NIMH
 (i) National Institute of Medical Herbalists
 National Institute of Mental Health
 NIN – (i) Nine Inch Nails (band)
 NIO – (s) Nicaraguayan cordoba oro (ISO 4217 currency code)
 NIOSH – (a) National Institute for Occupational Safety and Health (U.S.)
 NIPR – (i) National Institute of Polar Research (Japan)
 NIPT - Non-Invasive Prenatal Testing
 NIR – (s) Northern Ireland (FIFA trigram; not eligible for an ISO 3166 or IOC trigram)
 NISAC – (a) U.S. National Infrastructure Simulation and Analysis Center
 NISCAP – (a) NSA Information System Certification and Accreditation Program
 NISER – (i) National Institute of Science Education and Research
 NIST – (a/i) National Institute of Standards and Technology
 NIT
 (i) National Invitation Tournament (U.S. college basketball)
 (i) National Institutes of Technology (India)
 NITFS – (i) National Imagery Transmission Format Standard
 NIU – (s) Niue (ISO 3166 trigram)
 NIV
 (i) New International Version (Bible translation)
 Non-invasive ventilation

NJ
 nJ – (s) Nanojoule
 NJ – (s) New Jersey (postal symbol)
 NJHS – (s) National Junior Honor Society
 NJPW – (i) New Japan Pro-Wrestling

NK
 nK – (s) Nanokelvin
 NKA – No Known Allergies
 N/K/A – Now Known As
 NKJV – (i) New King James Version (Bible translation)
 NKVD – (i) Narodnyi Komissariat Vnutrennikh Del (Russian "People's Commissariat of Internal Affairs") (1934–1954)

NL
 nl – (s) Dutch language (ISO 639-1 code)
 nL – (s) Nanolitre
 NL
 (s) Netherlands (ISO 3166 and FIPS 10-4 country code digram)
 Newfoundland and Labrador (postal symbol)
 NLB – (i) Non-Linear Battlefield
 nld – (s) Dutch language (ISO 639-2 code)
 NLD – (s) Netherlands (ISO 3166 trigram)
 NLF – (i) National Liberation Front (disambiguation)
 NLL – (i) National Lacrosse League
 NLIC - (p) NetLicensing (license file extension)
 NLOS-LS – (i) Non Line Of Sight-Launch System
 NLP
(i) Natural Language Processing
 Neuro-Linguistic Programming (pseudoscience)
 NLW – (i) Non-Lethal Weapon

NM
 nm – (s) nanometer
 nm, NM – Nautical mile
 N·m, Nm – Newton meter
 NM – (s) New Mexico (postal symbol)
 NMCI – (i) Navy Marine Corps Intranet
 NMCS – (i) Not Mission Capable Supply (SM&R code)
 NMD – (i) U.S. National Missile Defense
 NMN – (i) No middle name
 NMOS – (i/a) N-type/Negative Metal-Oxide-Semiconductor transistor ("enn-moss")
 NMSG – (i) NATO Modelling and Simulation Group
 NMR – (i) Nuclear Magnetic Resonance
 NMHNFG – (i) Not Made Here, No Fucking Good

NN
 nn – (s) Norwegian Nynorsk language (ISO 639-1 code)
 nN – (s) Nanonewton
 NNE – (i) North North-East
 nno – (s) Norwegian Nynorsk language (ISO 639-2 code)
 NNSA – (i) U.S. National Nuclear Security Administration
 NNW – (i) North North-West

NO
 no – (s) Norwegian language (ISO 639-1 code)
 No – (s) Nobelium
 NO
 (s) Nitric Oxide
 (i) Normally Open
 (s) Norway (ISO 3166 and FIPS 10-4 country code digram)
 NOAA – (a) U.S. National Oceanic and Atmospheric Administration
 NOAF – (i) Norwegian Air Force
 NOAO – (i) National Optical Astronomy Observatory
 nob – (s) Norwegian Bokmål language (ISO 639-2 code)
 NOC – (i) UK. National Oceanography Centre
 NODEF – (a) NATO Oceanographic Data Exchange Format
 No-FEAR – (p) Notification and Federal Employee Antidiscrimination Retaliation Act (2002)
 NOK – (s) Norwegian krone (ISO 4217 currency code)
 NOLA – (p) New Orleans, Louisiana (LA is the official postal code for Louisiana)
 NOGI – (a) New Orleans Grande Isle (award for diving)
 NOLF – (i) Navy OutLying Field
 NOM – (i) Novus Ordo Missae or New Ordinary of the Mass (sometimes abbreviated to simply "NO")
 NOME – Not on Mars Either
 NoMBO – (p) Non-mine, Mine-like Bottom Object
 NOME – Not on Mars Either (see NIMBY)
 NOPA – (i) National Office Products Alliance – National Office Products Association
 nor – (s) Norwegian language (ISO 639-2 code)
 NOR – (s) Norway (ISO 3166 trigram)
 NORAD – (p) North American Aerospace Defense Command
 NORCECA – (p) North, Central America and Caribbean Volleyball Confederation
 NORELPREF – No religious preference
 NORML – (a) National Organization for the Reform of Marijuana Laws ("normal")
 NORTHAG – (p) Northern Army Group
 NOS
 (i) Network Operating System
 New Old Stock (Internet auction/trading listings)
 Nitric Oxide Synthase (enzyme)
 NOSA – (i) NATO OSI Security Architecture
 NOTAFLOF – (a) No One Turned Away For Lack Of Funds
 NOTAM – (p) Notice to Airmen
 NOW – (a) National Organization for Women

NP
 Np
 (p) Neap tide (nautical charts)
 (s) Neptunium
 NP
 (s) National Permit (authorization used in India to allow trucks to go anywhere in the nation)
 Nepal (ISO 3166 and FIPS 10-4 country code digram)
 NPB – (i) Nippon Professional Baseball
 NPC
 (i) National Postgraduate Committee
 National Provincial Championship (New Zealand rugby competition)
 Navigation Planning Chart
 Non-Player Character (role-playing games)
 NPCS – (i) Non-Passenger Coaching stock (in Railways)
 NPD – (i) Nationaldemokratische Partei Deutschlands (German)
 NPDI – (i) New Product Development and Introduction
 NPG – (i) Needline/Network Participation Group
 NPH – (i) Normal Pressure Hydrocephalus
 NPL
 (i) National Priorities List
 (s) Nepal (ISO 3166 trigram)
NPPU - Nose Personal Protection Unit (copper nose insert)
 NPOV – (i) Neutral Point Of View
 NPR
 (i) National Public Radio
 (s) Nepalese rupee (ISO 4217 currency code)

NQ
 NQ – (s) Dronning Maud Land (ISO 3166 digram; obsolete 1983)
 NQOCD – (i) Not Quite Our Class, Dear (or Darling). (Upper-class English slang)
 NPO  –  nothing by mouth

NR
 nr – (s) Southern Ndebele language (ISO 639-1 code)
 NR – (s) Nauru (ISO 3166 and FIPS 10-4 country code digram)
 NRA – (i) National Rifle Association of America
 NRAO – (i) National Radio Astronomy Observatory
 NRC
 (i) National Register of Citizens (India)
 National Research Council (U.S.)
 Nuclear Regulatory Commission (U.S.)
 NRDC – (i) (U.S.) Natural Resources Defense Council
 NREL – (i) U.S. National Renewable Energy Laboratory
 NRK – (p) Norsk Rikskringkasting (Norwegian Broadcasting Corporation)
 NRMP – (i) National Resident Matching Program (U.S. medicine)
 NRO – (i) U.S. National Reconnaissance Office
 NRT – (i) Near Real Time
 NRTA
 (i)  National Retail Tenants Association
 National Retired Teachers Association
 Northwest Regional Transmission Association
 NRU – (s) Nauru (ISO 3166 trigram)

NS
 ns – (s) Nanosecond
 nS – (s) Nanosiemens
 NS
 (s) Norfolk Southern Railway (AAR reporting mark)
 Nova Scotia (postal symbol)
 Suriname (FIPS 10-4 country code)
 NSA
 (i) U.S. National Security Agency
 Naval Support Activity
 No Strings Attached
 NSABB – (i) National Science Advisory Board for Biosecurity
 NSAID – (i) Non-Steroidal Anti-Inflammatory Drug
 NSB – (i) Norges Statsbaner (Norwegian State Railways)
 NSBM – (i) National Socialist black metal
 NSC – National Security Council
 NSDA – (i) National Speech and Debate Association (US)
 NSDAP – (i) Nationalsozialistische Deutsche Arbeiterpartei (German: "German National Socialist Workers Party", the formal name of the Nazi Party)
 NSDL – (i) National Science Digital Library (US)
 NSG – (i) National System for Geospatial-Intelligence
 NSN – (i) National Stock Number
 NSNA – (i) National Student Nurses' Association
 NSO – (i) National Standardization Office (ABCA)
 NSS – (i) (U.S.) Naval Simulation System
 NST – (i) (UK) Nimrod Software Team
 NSTAC – (i) National Security Telecommunications Advisory Committee
 NSV – (i) Nikitin-Sokolov-Volkov heavy machine gun (Russian НСВ Никитина-Соколова-Волкова) :ru:ПулеметНСВ-12,7 "Утес"
 NSW – (i) New South Wales (postal symbol)

NT
 N/T – (Aa) No text
 nT – (s) Nanotesla
 NT
 (i) National Trust (UK)
 (s) Saudi–Iraqi neutral zone (ISO 3166 digram; obsolete 1993)
 (i) New Technology (Windows NT)
 (s) Northern Territory (Australia) (postal symbol)
 Northwest Territories (Canada) (postal symbol)
 NTC
 (i) National Training Center
 Negative Temperature Coefficient (thermistor)
 NTDS – (i) Naval Tactical Data System
 NTP – (i) Network Time Protocol
 NTR – (i) Network Time Reference
 NTRA – (i) National Thoroughbred Racing Association
 NTSB – (i) National Transportation Safety Board
 NTSC – (i) National Television Standards Committee (colloquially, Never Twice the Same Color)
 (i) (Internet Abbreviation:) Nothing To See Here
 NTV – (i) Non-Tactical Vehicle
 NTY – (i) (Internet Abbreviations:) Not Tested Yet; (Alternatively) No Thank You
 NTZ – (s) Iraq-Saudi Arabia Neutral Zone (ISO 3166 trigram; obsolete 1993)

NU
 NU
 (s) Nicaragua (FIPS 10-4 country code)
 Niue (ISO 3166 digram)
 Nunavut (postal symbol)
 NUI – (a) No user interface ("noo-ey")
 NUL
 (i) Null character (ASCII code of control character)
 National Urban League
 NUTS – (a) Nuclear Utilization Target Selection
 NUWC – (i) U.S. Naval Undersea Warfare Center

NV
 nv – (s) Navajo language (ISO 639-1 code)
 nV – (s) Nanovolt
 NV
 (i) Naamloze vennootschap (Dutch, "innominate partnership" or "anonymous venture"; i.e. a public limited-liability company)
 (s) Nevada (postal symbol)
 NVEOL – (i) Night Vision and Electro-Optics Laboratory
 NVESD – (i) CERDEC Night Vision and Electronic Sensors Directorate, Fort Belvoir, Virginia
 NVG – (i) Night Vision Goggles
 NVL – (i) Night Vision Laboratory

NW
 nW – (s) Nanowatt
 NW – (s) North-West
 NW – (i) Nuclear Weapon
 NWA – (i) National Wrestling Alliance
 NWF – (i) National Wildlife Federation
 NWFZ – (i) Nuclear-Weapon-Free Zone
 NWHN – (i) U.S. National Women's Health Network
 nWo – (i) New World Order (see article for explanation of idiosyncratic capitalization)
 NWOAHM – (i) New Wave of American Heavy Metal
 NWOBHM – (i) New wave of British heavy metal (sometimes pronounced  as if it were an acronym)
 NWRA – (i) National Wildlife Rehabilitators Association
 NWSL - (i) National Women's Soccer League (U.S.)
 NWT – (i) North-West Territories

NX
NX
 (p) Part of computer memory marked as "no execute"
 (i) Automobile made by Nissan
 (s) unit of illuminance
 (p) National Express
 Net exports
NXA – (i) 21st arcade game in the Pump It Up series
NXD – (p) Native XML
NXE – (i) New Xbox Experience
NXG – (p) New Cross Gate station
NXL – (i) National XBall League
NXN – (p) Nike Cross Nationals
NXP – (p) "Next Experience" Semiconductors

NY
 ny – (s) Chichewa language (ISO 639-1 code)
 NY – (s) New York (postal symbol)
 nya – (s) Chichewa language (ISO 639-2 code)
 NYHA – (i) New York Heart Association
 NYO – (i) National Youth Orchestra of Great Britain
 NYRA
 (i) National Youth Rights Association
 (a) New York Racing Association (horse racing) 
 NYSE – (i) New York Stock Exchange
 NYT (disambiguation) – (i) The New York Times

NZ
 NZ – (s) New Zealand (ISO 3166 and FIPS 10-4 country code digram)
 NZC – (i) New Zealand Cricket
 NZD – (s) New Zealand dollar (ISO 4217 currency code)
 NZL – (s) New Zealand (ISO 3166 trigram)
 NzL – Noze looan (online/event listings)
 NZOSS – (i) New Zealand Open Source Society
 NZR
 (i) New Zealand Railways
 New Zealand Rugby (governing body for rugby union)
 NZRU – (i) New Zealand Rugby Union, the former name of the organisation now known as New Zealand Rugby

References

Acronyms N